Céline Bonnet (born 2 February 1976) is a French former backstroke and medley swimmer who competed in the 1992 Summer Olympics.

References

External links 
 

1976 births
Living people
French female backstroke swimmers
French female medley swimmers
Olympic swimmers of France
Swimmers at the 1992 Summer Olympics
Mediterranean Games gold medalists for France
Mediterranean Games medalists in swimming
Swimmers at the 1991 Mediterranean Games
20th-century French women
21st-century French women